Oprescu is a Romanian surname. Notable people with the surname include:

George Oprescu (1881–1969), Romanian art critic and historian
Nicolae Oprescu (born 1953), Romanian artistic gymnast
Sorin Oprescu (born 1951), Romanian politician and doctor

Romanian-language surnames